Owchghaz-e Olya (also Romanized as Owchghāz-e ‘Olyā; also known as Balūkān, Būlū Kāndī, Owjīqāz-e Bālā, Ūchqāz-e Bālā, Ūjeghāz-e Bālā, Ūjqāz, Ūjqāz-e Bālā, Ūjqāz-e ‘Olyā, Verkhnyaya Dzhigas, and Yūjqāz-e Bālā) is a village in Sanjabad-e Sharqi Rural District, in the Central District of Khalkhal County, Ardabil Province, Iran. At the 2006 census, its population was 821, in 175 families.

References 

Towns and villages in Khalkhal County